Manuel Marras (born 9 July 1993) is an Italian footballer. He plays for  club Cosenza on loan from Bari.

Biography
Born in Genoa, capital of Liguria region, Marras was a youth product of Genoa C.F.C. He was the member of U16 and U17 team from 2008 to 2010. In 2010, he was signed by Spezia, another Ligurian club. Marras was a player of the reserve team. Marras also made his professional debut for the champion of the third division during 2011–12 Lega Pro Prima Divisione. Marras played once for Lega Pro U20 representative team against England C on 28 February 2012.

On 30 July 2012 Marras left for the fourth division club Rimini in temporary deal. On 23 July 2013 he was signed by Savona.

In the season 14-15 plays for F.C. Südtirol.

In the summer 2015 he was signed by Alessandria. After 2 seasons with Alessandria on 16 August 2017 he was signed by Trapani Calcio.

On 13 July 2018 he signed for Serie B club Pescara.

On 2 September 2019, he signed with Livorno.

On 15 September 2020 he joined Bari on a 3-year contract. On 28 January 2022, he moved to Serie B club Crotone on loan with a conditional obligation to buy. On 18 January 2023, Marras was loaned by Cosenza.

References

External links
 Football.it profile 

Italian footballers
Association football forwards
Genoa C.F.C. players
Spezia Calcio players
Rimini F.C. 1912 players
Savona F.B.C. players
U.S. Alessandria Calcio 1912 players
Trapani Calcio players
Delfino Pescara 1936 players
U.S. Livorno 1915 players
S.S.C. Bari players
F.C. Crotone players
Cosenza Calcio players
Serie B players
Serie C players
Footballers from Genoa
1993 births
Living people